Manella is a surname. Notable people with the surname include:

Luiz Manella (born 1995), Brazilian-born American figure skater
Nora Margaret Manella (born 1951), American judge